The Mark 81 (Mk 81)  general-purpose bomb (nicknamed "Firecracker") is the smallest of the Mark 80 series of low-drag general-purpose bombs.

Development and deployment
Developed for United States military forces in the 1950s, it was first used during the Vietnam War. The power of the Mk 81 was found to be inadequate for U.S. military tactical use, and it was quickly discontinued, although license-built copies or duplicates of this weapon remain in service with various other nations.

Development of a precision guided variant of the Mk 81 bomb (GBU-29) was started due to its potential to reduce collateral damage compared to larger bombs, but this program has now been cancelled in favor of the Small Diameter Bomb.

Variants
Mark 81 Snakeye fitted with a Mark 14 TRD (Tail Retarding Device) to increase the bomb's drag after release. The bomb's increased air-time, coupled with its (relatively) forgiving safe drop envelope, allowed for very low-level bombing runs at slower speed. Used commonly in the close air support role in Vietnam (prior to wider availability of GBU-series precision ordnance).  Nicknamed "snake", as in the typical Vietnam support loadout of "snake and nape" (250-lb. Mk-81 Snakeye bombs and 500-lb. M-47 napalm canisters).
GBU-29 Joint Direct Attack Munition, a precision guided version of the Mark 81 (cancelled).

See also
Mark 82 bomb
Mark 83 bomb
Mark 84 bomb

References

Citations

Sources

External links
Mk81 GP Bomb
Mk81 General-Purpose Bomb
DUMB BOMBS, FUZES, AND ASSOCIATED COMPONENTS

Cold War aerial bombs of the United States
Military equipment introduced in the 1950s